Ardashir I Kushanshah was the first Kushanshah of the Kushano-Sasanian Kingdom from 233 to 245. He was succeeded by Peroz I Kushanshah.

Name 
Ardashir is the Middle Persian form of the Old Persian Ṛtaxšira (also spelled Artaxšaçā, meaning "whose reign is through truth"). Three kings of the Achaemenid Empire were known to have the same name.

Reign 

"Kushano-Sasanian" is a historiographic term used by modern scholars when referring to a dynasty of monarchs who supplanted the Kushan Empire in the Tukharistan region, and ultimately in both Kabulistan and Gandhara as well. According to the historian Khodadad Rezakhani, the dynasty was seemingly a young branch of the House of Sasan, and perhaps a offspring of one of the Sasanian King of Kings. It was founded in 233 by Ardashir I Kushanshah after his appointment by the first Sasanian King of Kings, Ardashir I. The Kushano-Sasanians, in the same manner as the Kushans, used the title of Kushanshah ("Kushan King"), thus demonstrating a continuum with their predecessors.

The coins of Ardashir I Kushanshah had the Bactrian legend AP∆AÞΟPΟ KΟÞANΟ ÞAΟ, "Ardashir, the Kushan Shah". Some of his coins also had a Pahlavi legend on the reverse reading mzdysn bgy arthštr RBA kwšan MLK "The Mazda-worshipping lord Ardashir the Great Kushan Shah". The reverse of his Bactrian-written coins depicted the goddess Anahita, whilst the ones written in Pahlavi depicted Mithra. Several of Ardashir I Kushanshah's coins have been found together with coins of the Kushan ruler Vasishka, suggesting a level of interaction between the two rulers.

References

Sources 
 
 
 
  
 
 

Kushanshahs
3rd-century monarchs in Asia
3rd-century Iranian people
Monarchs of the Kushano-Sasanian Kingdom